The Dying Rooms is a 1995 television documentary film about Chinese state orphanages. It was directed by Kate Blewett and Brian Woods and produced by Lauderdale Productions. It first aired on Channel 4 in the United Kingdom and in 1996, was aired on Cinemax. A follow-up film, Return to the Dying Rooms, was released in 1996.

In 1996, the film won a Peabody Award. It also won a News & Documentary Emmy Award.

Synopsis
In the film, Blewett and others travel to Mainland China to visit orphanages that housed children that were abandoned as a result of the "one-child policy". The filmmakers stated that unwanted female and disabled children were left to die of neglect, which would enable the child's parents to have another child. While filming, the crew used hidden cameras to collect footage and Blewett used a false name while visiting the orphanages.

Reception
After its release, the Mainland Chinese government repudiated the documentary's claims, stating that Blewett fabricated the claims in the documentary. A rebuttal to the documentary, The Dying Rooms: A Patchwork of Lies, was also filmed. The documentary was also criticized by Irish charity Health Action Overseas.  Two Irish aid coordinators for the charity traveled to China to visit the orphanages and reported that the claims in both The Dying Rooms and Return to the Dying Rooms were "wholly exaggerated, and almost completely without substance".

In Patrick Tyler's review of Blewett's film, the New York Times stated that "Compelling images of neglect were captured on tape at this orphanage, and the rebuttal offered by the Government did not succeed in addressing the poor condition of the infants found on the day of the film crew's visit." Walter Goodman also reviewed the film for the paper, stating that "Kate Blewett, Brian Woods and Peter Hugh have not made a balanced or polished documentary. But more important, they have raised international concern over the fate of the children glimpsed here, some of whom have already joined countless others in unmarked graves."

References

External links
 
 The Dying Rooms & Return to the Dying Rooms at True Vision

Child’s Room

1995 films
British television documentaries
British documentary films
Documentary films about China
Documentary films about child abuse
Peabody Award-winning broadcasts
Orphanages in China
Documentary films about orphanages
1995 documentary films
1990s English-language films
1990s British films